Empress of Australia was a ferry operated by the Australian National Line. Ordered in 1962 by the Australian National Line and launched by Cockatoo Docks & Engineering Company on 18 January 1964, Empress of Australia was the largest passenger ferry built in the world.

From the time of her 16 January 1965 maiden voyage, the ship could carry up to 250 passengers in cabins, 91 cars, 16 trucks, and 160 intermodal containers. The ferry made three runs from Sydney to Tasmania every fortnight until 1972; one each to Hobart, Bell Bay and Burnie.

In 1972, the ship was transferred to the Melbourne to Tasmania route, replacing . She was modified at the State Dockyard: the installation of 190 reclining seats in the original lounge increased her passenger capacity to 440, and a deck was added at the aft end. Empress of Australia began sailing between Melbourne and Devonport on 28 June 1972, and continued making Bass Strait crossings until 1986.

The ship was sold to Cypriot owners and heavily refitted and converted into a cruise ship, she was renamed Royal Pacific. On 23 August 1992, she was rammed by the Taiwanese fishing vessel Terfu 51 in the Straits of Malacca, and sank, resulting in thirty deaths.
The deaths are most likely attributed to the crew's choice to abandon ship first.

References

External links
 
 

1964 ships
Ships built in New South Wales
Ferries of Tasmania
Royal Pacific
Bass Strait ferries
Maritime incidents in 1992
Ships sunk in collisions
Sunken cruise ships